James Albert may refer to:

 James S. Albert, professor of biology
 James Albert (screenwriter), Indian script writer and director